The Red Road Flats were a mid-twentieth-century high-rise housing complex located between the districts of Balornock and Barmulloch in the northeast of the city of Glasgow, Scotland. The estate originally consisted of eight multi-storey blocks of steel frame construction. All were demolished by 2015. Two were "slabs", much wider in cross-section than they are deep. Six were "points", more of a traditional tower block shape. The slabs had 28 floors (26 occupiable and 2 mechanical), the point blocks 31 (30 occupiable and 1 mechanical), and taken together, they were designed for a population of 4,700 people. The 30th floor of the point blocks were the highest inhabitable floor level of any building in Glasgow.

Views from the upper floors drew the eye along the Campsie Fells to Ben Lomond and the Arrochar Alps, then west past the Erskine Bridge and out to Goat Fell on the Isle of Arran continuing south over Glasgow and East towards Edinburgh. The 31st floor of the point blocks and the corresponding 28th floor of the slabs were reserved as a communal drying area.

Among the best-known of Glasgow's highrise housing developments of the 1960s, the buildings were formally condemned in July 2008 after a long period of decline, with their phased demolition taking place in three stages between 2010 and 2015.

Construction
After the publication of the Bruce Report in 1946, Glasgow Corporation identified Comprehensive Development Areas (CDAs), which were largely inner-urban districts (such as the Gorbals, Anderston and Townhead), with a high proportion of overcrowded slum housing. These areas would see the mass demolition of overcrowded and insanitary tenement slum housing, and their replacement with lower density housing schemes to create space for modern developments. The dispersed population would be relocated to new estates built on green belt land on the outer periphery of the city's metropolitan area, with others moved out to the New Towns of Cumbernauld and East Kilbride. These initiatives began to be implemented in the late 1950s.

Barlornock was a green belt area that had undergone little development before the construction of the Red Road estate. The original plan for Red Road was far more modest than the eventual high-rise scheme – it called for a complex of maisonettes no taller than 4 storeys. What emerged was Glasgow Corporation architect Sam Bunton's scheme to house a population of 4,700 people in 28- and 31-storey tower blocks which were at the time the highest in Europe, although they were quickly surpassed when Birmingham City Housing Department opened The Sentinels, two 32 storey council blocks in 1971 (these were themselves surpassed by the 42-storey Barbican Estate in the City of London completed in 1973).

Criticism
Contemporary critics of the scheme accused Bunton – who was close to retirement at the time – of championing the development as a personal vanity project; he was well known within Glasgow Corporation as a strong proponent of high-rise housing; his practice having designed other similar multi-storey estates around the city. Bunton was said to have dreamt of "building a Manhattan-style skyscraper" in Glasgow, hence the use of the steel frame construction system in place of the "system-built" pre-fabricated concrete panel method which had been used for all other tower blocks built in the city up until that point. This would create one of the estate's most significant legacies – steel construction had to be fire-proofed, which meant the use of asbestos, a legacy which would blight the estate in the coming years. Bunton argued for the steel frame in numerous letters to the Glasgow Herald in February 1963, claiming "it is the best material available in the construction field since it brings into active participation an array of steel erectors, and the resources of an industry which is at present only working at one-third of its capacity", thus suggesting that local politics (primarily lobbying from Glasgow's underworked steel fabrication industries) had shaped the design of the buildings in other ways.

The first three towers were formally opened on 28 October 1966, by the then Scottish Secretary, Willie Ross. For most of the early residents, living in the flats meant a considerable and welcome rise in their living conditions, since most had previously lived in much worse housing, often severely overcrowded, either nearby or elsewhere in the city. From the time they were built until recent years, they were owned by the local council.

Use of asbestos
During the original construction, large amounts of asbestos were used to ensure the structural integrity of the buildings' steel frames in the event of a fire. Despite contemporary concerns over the suitability of the nature of the fire proofing solution used in the buildings, Bunton vehemently defended it, stating in an article to the International Asbestos Cement Review in 1966; "steel and asbestos in partnership with social others operate as the collective that stabilises Red Road and holds it together, albeit provisionally, as a viable, safe housing solution".

Two decades later it became widely known that the use of this material caused illnesses and deaths, and whilst some of it was removed over the course of the life of the buildings – between 1979 and 1982 the buildings were fitted with coloured metal overcladding to cover the exterior asbestos walls, whilst the slab blocks had additional external fire escapes built in the late 1980s 
– asbestos was integral to their structure and could not be fully removed until the buildings were demolished.

Decline

By the 1970s the estate had gained a reputation for anti-social crime, ranging from disaffected youths throwing objects from the roofs to frequent burglaries. Such problems were less severe than those evident in parts of the city such as the nearby low-rise Blackhill estate, long dominated by ruthless crime gangs. But they were able to strike a nerve in the perceptions of non-residents, owing partly to the "looming" ambience of the blocks which in some ways might be called emblematic. The slab blocks, for example, were not only 25 storeys high but also almost 100 metres (300') wide.

A major turning point came in August 1977, when a fire started by vandals in an empty flat on the 23rd floor of 10 Red Road Court, caused serious structural damage to the building, resulting in the death of a 12-year-old boy and a large number of tenants being evacuated. Many refused to return to their ruined homes, since the fire had brought to the fore the issues surrounding the asbestos lining used in the buildings, and prompted the outer refurbishment of the towers. As a mark of respect, the flat on Floor 23 of 10 Red Road Court was never let out again for rent, and instead was refurbished as a drop-in "community flat" with social amenities for the whole estate. Around 1980 the authorities declared two of the blocks (10 Red Road Court and 33 Petershill Drive) unfit as family accommodation and transferred them for use by students and the YMCA respectively. These happened to be the blocks closest to the front of the complex when approached from the city centre. Being nearest the bus stop, they were also easiest to locate for the YMCA guests and university students.
 

By the time the 1980s had dawned, it had become clear that the optimism that had surrounded the policy of high rise housing had waned in less than two decades, and despite attempts to regenerate the estate, drug dealing, muggings and other serious crime continued, and the towers also became a frequent spot for suicides. Along with the equally controversial and derided Hutchesontown C estate in the Gorbals, Red Road became increasingly looked upon as a monument to the errors of Glasgow's ambitious post-war housing renewal policy.

Improvements
Measures were introduced in the 1980s which gave residents increased protection. These included the control of access through the communal entrance doors by means of RFID keys and intercoms, and the installation of round-the-clock concierge facilities. Crime fell dramatically.

Refugees
By the 1990s, residents included refugees from the Kosovo War. Later residents included people who had fled from countries in Africa, Asia, and elsewhere in Europe.

Transfer to housing association ownership
The position changed dramatically in 2003 when the flats were transferred, after a ballot, to a housing association in the shape of the Glasgow Housing Association Ltd. The practice of transferring housing stock from public to private ownership had initially been launched in the 1970s as a flagship policy promoted by the Conservative Party. At that time, the recipients were individual tenants who opted to buy their homes, or long-term leases thereon. Twenty years later the policy was continued by the  Labour Party led council, which transferred its entire housing stock to a single company set up for the purpose.

Demolition

Soon the new landlords as well as the council insisted that repairs were costing more than receipts in rent, and that big changes therefore had to be made. In 2005 Glasgow Housing Association announced its intention to demolish one of the tallest blocks as part of a regeneration of the area.

Defend Council Housing, a pro-council housing campaign group, set up a local campaign against the demolition, seeking to ensure the scheme's continued existence. However, all the eight buildings were planned for phased demolition beginning in the spring of 2010 and expected to be accomplished within a decade.

On 7 March 2010, the Serykh family, three asylum seekers, jumped to their deaths from one of the towers. These deaths galvanised much in the way of action in and around the Red Road. Various projects now exist to document the end of the flats positively, with the hope that everyone with memories of the flats will contribute actively to the projects as best they can.

The first block, the 28-floor slab block, was demolished by controlled explosion on 10 June 2012. The steel structured tower took just six seconds to fall after a series of carefully timed explosions, using  of explosive, ripped along the building around the sixth to eighth floors. The second block, the 31-floor point block on Birnie Court was demolished on 5 May 2013, at 11:46 a.m., taking about four seconds to fall.

In April 2014, it was announced that five of the remaining towers would be given a dramatic explosive demolition as part of the 2014 Commonwealth Games opening ceremony.  The spectacle would have the five towers simultaneously felled by controlled explosion, with the footage being broadcast live to large screens in Celtic Park.

Former MSP Carolyn Leckie criticised the demolition plans and called for the five flats to be "demolished with dignity, not for entertainment". She has said "the image of tower blocks coming down is not a positive international spectacle" and suggests it also conveys disregard for the asylum seekers living in the sixth tower, which would remain standing. The demolition plan for the Commonwealth Games was cancelled for safety reasons, but the flats were demolished the following year.

In August 2015, Glasgow Housing Association announced that all six remaining high-rise blocks would be brought down in a one-off demolition later in 2015.  The six remaining towers were demolished on 11 October 2015, after Sheriff Court interdicts (the Scottish law equivalent of an injunction) were obtained against a group of residents who refused to leave their nearby homes during the explosions. Two of the six blocks failed to completely collapse and remained partially standing. The contractors, Safedem carried out a review to determine the best way of completing the demolition and the partial remains of the two flats were eventually demolished using a high reach excavator.

In popular culture

The towers have often been used as locations by photographers and film makers, and have been the subject of various literary works. As well as making numerous appearances in the STV police drama Taggart, the estate was featured in the 2006 film, Red Road, which won a BAFTA and the Prix de Jury (third prize) at the Cannes film festival.

In July 2007, the French high wire artist Didier Pasquette, a protégé of Philippe Petit (famous for his high wire walk between the Twin Towers of the World Trade Center in New York), undertook a high wire stunt between two of the Red Road towers, attempting to cross the  gap between Towers 4 and 5.

From 19 February to 27 June 2010, the Red Road flats featured in the "Multi-Story" exhibition at Glasgow's Gallery of Modern Art (GOMA). Multi-story is a collaborative arts project based in the Red Road, established in 2004 by Street Level Photoworks in partnership with The Scottish Refugee Council and the YMCA.

On 14 March 2010, The Sunday Times in Scotland featured the recollections of Glasgow born film-maker, Matt Quinn, who grew up in the flats.

Glasgow Life, a part of the city authorities, have a project to document the Red Road experience. This features specially commissioned photography, film and even a novel to celebrate life in 'the scheme'. On 15 March 2010 this was updated to include volume 1 of "Your Stories" which features the recollections of the area by various local people. Alison Irvine published the novel This Road Is Red (2012); a collection of semi-fictional stories based on anecdotes from real-life residents over the 50-year history of the estate. The novel was illustrated by Mitch Miller, who produced a series of 4 dialectograms (large-scale documentary plan drawings) depicting everyday life within the flats.

The Red Road Flats were featured in the film The Legend of Barney Thomson (2015) during their demolition.

See also
 Glasgow tower blocks
List of tallest voluntarily demolished buildings 
Towers in the park

References

External links 
 
 demolition of 21 Birnie Court (video)
'End of the Red Road', study at Disappearing Glasgow
Homes In The Sky (1966), short video of construction at British Pathé

Housing estates in Glasgow
Modernist architecture in Scotland
Skyscrapers in Glasgow
Residential skyscrapers in Scotland
Urban decay in Europe
Demolished buildings and structures in Scotland
Residential buildings completed in 1968
Buildings and structures demolished in 2015
Buildings and structures demolished by controlled implosion
Former skyscrapers
1966 establishments in Scotland
2015 disestablishments in Scotland